Puya fosteriana is a species in the genus Puya. This species is endemic to Bolivia.

References

fosteriana
Flora of Bolivia